The State Cadastre Agency (ASHK) is an Albanian governmental agency created to address the issues of legalization, restitution and registration of housing and all immovable properties throughout the territory of Albania. The agency was formed by law No.111/2018 of the Albanian Parliament that resulted in the merger of ALUIZNI, the National Housing Authority and the  Immovable Property Registration Office. Its current director is Artan Lame.

References

 
Housing agencies of Albania